The Pupil is a Singaporean drama series that aired on MediaCorp Channel 5, revolving around the legal profession of Singaporean lawyers and the cases they take on as civil litigators. During its span of two years, the first season premiered on 7 January 2010, while the second season premiered on 18 August 2011, which concluded on 8 November of the same year.

The show received favourable reviews and multiple spin-offs were created based on the series, including Code Of Law, Derek and Forensik.

Characters 

 George Young joined the cast in Season 2.

Episodes

Season 1

Season 2

References

External links
 Official website (Season 1)
 xinmsn website (Season 2)
The Pupil Season 1
The Pupil Season 2

Singaporean television series
2010 Singaporean television series debuts
Channel 5 (Singapore) original programming